"Three A.M." is a song written by Bill Anderson and Jerry Todd. It was first recorded by its co-writer, Bill Anderson. It was released as a single in 1964 via Decca Records and became a major hit.

Background and release
"Three A.M." was recorded on August 20, 1964, at the Bradley Studio, located in Nashville, Tennessee. The sessions were produced by Owen Bradley, who would serve as Anderson's producer through most of years with Decca Records. Two additional tracks were recorded at the session: "In the Misty Moonlight" and "Then and Only Then."

"Three A.M." was released as a single by Decca Records in October 1964. The song spent 18 weeks on the Billboard Hot Country Singles before reaching number eight by February 1965. It was later released on his 1964 studio album Bill Anderson Sings.

Track listings
7" vinyl single
 "Three A.M." – 2:30
 "In Case You Ever Change Your Mind" – 2:22

Chart performance

References

1964 singles
1964 songs
Bill Anderson (singer) songs
Decca Records singles
Song recordings produced by Owen Bradley
Songs written by Bill Anderson (singer)